is a Japanese actress, voice actress and narrator. Throughout her life, she has been affiliated with Production Baobab, 81 Produce and self-owned Office Nozawa; she is also affiliated with Aoni Production. Her late husband, Masaaki Tsukada, was also a voice actor.

Nozawa is the voice of Son Goku, Son Gohan, & Son Goten in the popular anime franchise Dragon Ball. She has also voiced Tetsurō Hoshino (Galaxy Express 999) and Kitarō (GeGeGe no Kitarō, first and second series and Hakaba Kitarō and Yo-kai Watch Shadowside: Oni-ō no Fukkatsu). In addition, she has also voiced two separate characters named "Hiroshi"; a character in Dokonjō Gaeru, and the characters known in the U.S. as "Pidge" and "Haggar" in Hyakujūō Golion. She also voiced Doraemon in the 1973 anime, replacing Kōsei Tomita, who voiced the character in the first 26 episodes. In the 1979 anime, she was replaced by Nobuyo Ōyama, however, Nozawa voiced Doraemon again in a 1988 special entitled Early English with Doraemon.

Career 
Throughout her career as a voice actress, she has performed many male roles (most notably as all the male members of Son Goku's family in every piece of Japanese Dragon Ball media, with the exception of Raditz), leading Japanese fans to give her the nickname "The Eternal Boy". These days, however, she prefers the roles of elderly woman characters, although she continues to perform other roles (including young boys) occasionally. On April 1, 2006, she resigned from 81 Produce to establish office Nozawa. In 2012, Nozawa closed her Talent Agency. A number of voice actors who were affiliated with her agency went on to affiliate with Media Force. In 2017, it was revealed she had achieved two Guinness World Records; both of which were related to voicing the character Son Goku in Dragon Ball video games for 23 years and 218 days.

Nozawa's first career to play main characters was Kitarō for Gegege no Kitarō. 
Although Nozawa was disappointed that she couldn't reprise her role of Kitarō for the 1985 anime adaptation due to a rule that voice actors can't play more than one of main characters within the same television station at the same time, she noted that this eventually resulted in her casting of Son Goku for Dragon Ball series.

She has been noted for the Longest video game voice acting career and Voice actor who voiced the same character in a video game for the longest period, holding two Guinness World Records.

Filmography

Anime television series 
1960s
Tetsuwan Atom (1963)
Obake no Q-tarō (1965) (Shin'ichi Ōhara)
Sally, the Witch (1966) (Tonkichi Hanamura)
Ge Ge Ge no Kitaro (1968) (Kitaro)
Star of the Giants (1968)
Cyborg 009 (1968)
Sabu to Ichi Torimono Hikae (1968)
Attack No.1 (1969) (Tonan high school captain Higaki)
Tiger Mask (1969) (Takeshi)
Marine Boy (1969)

1970s
Inakappe Taishō (1970) (Daizaemon Kaze)
Andersen Stories (1971) (Marco)
Ge Ge Ge no Kitaro (1971) (Kitaro)
Dokonjō Gaeru (1972) (Hiroshi)
Casshan (1973) (Māru)
Dororon Enma-kun (1973) (Enma-kun)
Doraemon (1973) (Doraemon, Botako)
Calimero (1974) (Buta)
Hoshi no Ko Poron (1974) (All Roles)
Gamba no Bōken (1975) (Gamba)
La Seine no Hoshi (1975) (Danton)
Maya the Bee (1975) (Willy)
Combattler V (1976) (Ropet, Oreana, Kinta Ichinoki)
Piccolino no Bōken (1976) (Pinocchio)
Araiguma Rascal (1977) (Rascal)
Ore wa Teppei (1977) (Teppei Uesugi)
Galaxy Express 999 (1978) (Tetsurō Hoshino)

1980s
The Adventures of Tom Sawyer (1980) (Tom Sawyer)
Kaibutsu-kun (1980) (Tarō Kaibutsu)
Tsurikichi Sampei (1980) (Sampei)
Urusei Yatsura (1981) (Kintarō)
Miss Machiko (1981) (Kenta Ikegami)
Golion/Voltron (1981) (Hiroshi Suzuishi/Pidge, Honerva/Haggar)
The Mysterious Cities of Gold (1982) (Esteban)
Ginga Hyōryū Vifam series (1983) (Kentsu Norton)
Igano Kabamaru (1983) (Sū Matsuno, young Kabamaru Igano)
Bumpety Boo (1986) (Bumbo)
Dragon Ball (1986) (Son Goku)
The Wonderful Wizard of Oz (1986) (Princess Ozma)
Ai Shōjo Pollyanna Monogatari (1986) (Polly Harrington)
Aoi Blink (1989) (Kakeru)
Dash! Yonkuro (1989) (Yonkuro Hinomaru)
Dragon Ball Z (1989) (Son Goku, Son Gohan, Bardock, Son Goten, Gotenks, Vegetto)

1990s
Jungle Emperor (1990) (Gibo)
Dragon Ball Z: Bardock – The Father of Goku (1990) (Bardock, Son Goku)
Honō no Tōkyūji: Dodge Danpei (1991) (Chin'nen Kobotoke)
Dragon Ball Z: The History of Trunks (1993) (Son Gohan)
Dragon Ball GT (1996) (Son Goku, Son Gohan, Son Goten, Gogeta, Son Goku Jr.)
Dual! Parallel Trouble Adventure (1999) (Urara Nanjōin)
Alice SOS (1999)

2000s
Hamtaro (2000) (Ohamuba-san [Auntie Viv], Roko-chan's ["Laura"'s] Grandma)
Love Hina (2000) (Hina Urashima)
Kindaichi Case Files (2000) (Tomoyo Konta)
One Piece (2001) (Doctor Kureha)
Digimon Tamers (2001) (Guilmon, Dukemon, Narrator)
A Little Snow Fairy Sugar (2001) (Regina Bergman)
Case Closed (2001) (Furuyo Senma)
Rockman EXE Beast+ (2002) (Electel Mama)
Mirmo! (2003) (Kinta)
Digital Monster X-Evolution (2005) (Dukemon)
Pocket Monsters Advanced Generation (2005) (Masamune)
Tsubasa Chronicle (2005) (Kaigyo)
Kirarin Revolution (2006) (Grandmother)
Love Get Chu (2006) (Takemiya-sensei)
Naruto (2006) (Old Woman) episode 187–188, (Garrod Ran) OVA
Digimon Savers (2007) (Dukemon)
Hatara Kizzu Maihamu Gumi (2007) (Gaudi)
Hakaba Kitaro (2008) (Kitaro)
Cross Game (2009) (Nomo)
Dragon Ball Kai (2009) (Son Goku, Son Gohan, Bardock, Son Goten, Gotenks, Vegetto)
Marie & Gali (2009) (Marie Curie)
Shugo Chara! Shugo Chara!! Doki- Episode 75 (2009) (Maruyama Haruki)

2010s
Yumeiro Patissiere (2010) (French Chairwoman)
Keroro Gunso (2011) (Orara)
Nichijou (2011) (Frill-necked lizard in episode 10)
Tanken Driland (2012) (Bonny)
One Piece (2013) (Goku, Gohan, Goten)
Toriko (2013) (Goku, Gohan, Goten)
Ping Pong (2014) (Obaba)
Dragon Ball Super (2015) (Son Goku, Son Gohan, Son Goten, Gotenks, Goku Black, Vegetto)
Seiyu's Life! (2015) (Herself)
Rage of Bahamut (TV series) (2017) (Ryuuzoku Zokuchou)
Overlord (2018) Rigrit - Episode 01 - Season 2
GeGeGe no Kitarō (2018) (Medama-oyaji)
Mr. Tonegawa: Middle Management Blues (2018) Zawa Voice (001) - Episode 24
Dragon Ball Heroes (2018) (Son Goku, Son Goku (xeno), tbd)
Shinya! Tensai Bakabon (2018) Herself - Episode 01

2020s
Digimon Adventure (2020) (Narrator, YukimiBotamon)

Original video animation (OVA) 
Early English with Doraemon (1988) (Doraemon)
The Hakkenden (1990) (Kamezasa)
Plan to Eradicate the Saiyans (1990) (Goku, Gohan, Turles)
Iczer Girl Iczelion (1995) (Iczel)
Dragon Ball: Yo! Son Goku and His Friends Return!! (2008) (Son Goku, Son Gohan, Son Goten, Gotenks)
Plan to Eradicate the Super Saiyans (2010) (Goku, Gohan, Turles)
Dragon Ball: Episode of Bardock (2011) (Bardock)

Original net animation (ONA) 
Star Wars: Visions - T0-B1 (2021) (T0-B1)

Theatrical animation 
Flying Phantom Ship (1969) (Hayato)
30,000 Miles Under the Sea (1970) (Isamu)
Galaxy Express 999 (1979) (Tetsurō Hoshino)
Dragon Ball: Curse of the Blood Rubies (1986) (Son Goku)
Dragon Ball: Sleeping Princess in Devil's Castle (1987) (Son Goku)
Dragon Ball: Mystical Adventure (1988) (Son Goku)
Hare Tokidoki Buta (1988) (Yamada-san)
Dragon Ball Z: Dead Zone (1989) (Son Goku, Son Gohan)
Kiki's Delivery Service (1989) (Tombo's friend with pink shirt and red jacket)
Dragon Ball Z: The World's Strongest (1990) (Son Goku, Son Gohan)
Dragon Ball Z: The Tree of Might (1990) (Son Goku, Son Gohan, Tullece)
Kim's Cross (1990) (Kim Sae-Fan)
Dragon Ball Z: Lord Slug (1991) (Son Goku, Son Gohan)
Dragon Ball Z: Cooler's Revenge (1991) (Son Goku, Son Gohan, Bardock)
Dragon Ball Z: The Return of Cooler (1992) (Son Goku, Son Gohan)
Dragon Ball Z: Super Android 13! (1992) (Son Goku, Son Gohan)
Dragon Ball Z: Broly – The Legendary Super Saiyan (1993) (Son Goku, Son Gohan)
Dragon Ball Z: Bojack Unbound (1993) (Son Goku, Son Gohan)
Dragon Ball Z: Broly – Second Coming (1994) (Son Goku, Son Gohan, Son Goten)
Dragon Ball Z: Bio-Broly (1994) (Son Goku, Son Goten)
Dragon Ball Z: Fusion Reborn (1995) (Son Goku, Son Gohan, Son Goten, Gogeta, Gotenks)
Dragon Ball Z: Wrath of the Dragon (1995) (Son Goku, Son Gohan, Son Goten, Gotenks)
Dragon Ball: The Path to Power (1996) (Son Goku)
Doraemon: Nobita Drifts in the Universe (1999) (Rogu)
Ojarumaru (2000) (Semira)
Digimon Tamers: Battle of Adventurers (2001) (Guilmon)
Digimon Tamers: Runaway Locomon (2002) (Guilmon)
Doraemon: Nobita in the Robot Kingdom (2002) (Kururimpa)
Oshare Majo Love and Berry: Shiawase no Mahou (2007) (Headmistress Izabera)
Asura (2012) (Asura)
Doraemon: Nobita and the Island of Miracles—Animal Adventure (2012) (Nobisuke)
Dragon Ball Z: Battle of Gods (2013) (Son Goku, Son Gohan, Son Goten, Gotenks)
Dragon Ball Z: Resurrection 'F' (2015) (Son Goku, Son Gohan)
GAMBA (2015) (Tsuburi)
Kaze no Yō ni (2016) (Sanpei)
Kimi no Koe wo Todoketai (2017) (Nagisa's grandmother)
Yo-kai Watch Shadowside: Oni-ō no Fukkatsu (2017) (Kitaro)
Pokémon the Movie: Everyone's Story (2018) (Hisui)
Dragon Ball Super: Broly (2018) (Son Goku, Son Goten, Gogeta, Bardock)
Weathering with You (2019) (Fortune-teller) 
Dragon Ball Super: Super Hero (2022) (Son Goku, Son Gohan, Son Goten, Gotenks)
Kitarō Tanjō: Gegege no Nazo (2023) (Medama-oyaji)

Computer and video games 
Battle Stadium D.O.N (Son Goku, Son Gohan)
Super Robot Wars series (Oreana, Ropet, Cyclaminos)
Digimon Park (Guilmon)
Digimon Tamers Battle Evolution (Guilmon)
Digimon Racing (Guilmon)
Digimon Battle Chronicle (Guilmon)
Dragon Ball series (Son Goku, Son Gohan, Bardock, Son Goten, Turles, Vegetto, Gotenks, Gogeta, Goku Black)
Egg Monster Hero 4 (Four-Dimensional Empress)
Final Fantasy Type-0 (Commissar, Eumgyeong)
Kingdom Hearts series (Merryweather)
League of Legends (Wukong)
The Legend of Zelda: Skyward Sword (Old Woman)
PoPoRoGue (Gilda)
J-Stars Victory VS (Son Goku)
Jump Force (Son Goku)

Puppet shows 
Nobi Nobi Non-chan (1990–1996) (Tame-kun, Ana-chan's mother, Kitsune's granny)
Zawa Zawa Mori no Ganko-chan (1996–) (Kero-chan)

Dubbing roles

Live-action
Babe (2002 NTV edition) (Esmé Hoggett (Magda Szubanski))
Babe: Pig in the City (2004 NTV edition) (Esmé Hoggett (Magda Szubanski))
End of Days (2001 TV Asahi edition) (Mabel (Miriam Margolyes))
The Goonies (1988 TBS edition) (Clark, a.k.a., "Mouth" (Corey Feldman))
Indiana Jones and the Temple of Doom (Short Round (Ke Huy Quan))
Last Action Hero (1996 Fuji TV edition) (Danny Madigan (Austin O'Brien))
Little Fockers (Dina Byrnes (Blythe Danner))
Meet the Fockers (Dina Byrnes (Blythe Danner))
Meet the Parents (Dina Byrnes (Blythe Danner))
Ordinary People (Beth Jarrett (Mary Tyler Moore))
The Poseidon Adventure (Robin Shelby (Eric Shea))
Richie Rich (Richie (Macaulay Culkin))
Switch (Maggie Philbin (Sharon Gless))
To Kill a Mockingbird (1972 NET edition) (Jem Finch (Phillip Alford))
Vanishing on 7th Street (James Leary (Jacob Latimore))

Animation
Sleeping Beauty (1995 Buena Vista edition) (Merryweather)
Maya the Bee (Willy) (2014 movie)
Maya the Bee: The Honey Games (Willy)
The Croods (Gran Crood)
The Croods: A New Age (Gran Crood)

Live-action 
Onward Towards Our Noble Deaths (2007, TV) (Kitarō's voice)
Super Voice World: Yume to Jiyū to Happening (????, DVD)
Sono Koe no Anata e (2022, Film) (Herself)
Let's Talk About the Old Times (2022, Film) (Herself)

Tokusatsu 
Ambassador Magma (1967) (Gam's voice in episodes 41 and 42)
Robot 110-Ban (1977) (Gan-chan's voice)
Ultraman Story (1984) (young Ultraman Taro's voice)

Radio 
Seishun Adventure: Fūshin Engi (NHK-FM) (Nataku)

CD 
CD Theater: Dragon Quest (Merusera)
Doraemon Ondō (King Records cover)

Others 
Law of Ueki commercial for Shōnen Sunday (Kousuke Ueki)
Naruhodo! The World (narration)
NHK Kyōiku: Kagaku Daisukishi you Jaku (narration)
Toriko, One Piece and Dragon Ball Z Collaboration Special (Goku, Gohan and Goten)
Wakasa Seikatsu commercial (narration)
The Wide Friday Ranking (narration)

Awards

References

External links 
  
 
 

1936 births
Living people
Aoni Production voice actors
Japanese child actresses
Japanese stage actresses
Japanese video game actresses
Japanese voice actresses
Production Baobab voice actors
Voice actresses from Tokyo
World record holders
20th-century Japanese actresses
21st-century Japanese actresses
81 Produce voice actors